Derek Woodhead (7 September 1934 – 29 July 2011) was an Australian cricketer. He played seven first-class matches for Western Australia between 1958/59 and 1959/60.

References

External links
 

1934 births
2011 deaths
Australian cricketers
Western Australia cricketers
Cricketers from Perth, Western Australia